The 1472 Altarpiece was a tempera and oil on panel altarpiece by Carlo Crivelli, dated 1472 on the central panel. Also known as the Fesch Altarpiece or the Eckinson Altarpiece, it is now divided up between a number of galleries in the United States and Europe.

The work probably originated in or near Fermo, in the Marche, where the artist was active for a number of years. In 1834 Amico Ricci wrote of a "Madonna with saints" by Crivelli from the church of San Domenico in Fermo which had been sold a few years earlier. It is stylistically close to the artist's Massa Fermana Altarpiece. It had five panels on the main register, topped by a Pietà which may have been flanked by four now-lost unidentified half-length saints.

List of panels
An early reconstruction of the work was produced in 1933 by Venturi and this was improved in 1958 by Bernard Berenson and in 1961 by Federico Zeri:
top register
two half-length saints (lost)
Dead Christ Supported by Two Angels, 68x45 cm, Philadelphia Museum of Art
two half-length saints (lost)
main register
St James, 95x39 cm, Brooklyn Museum, New York
St Nicholas of Bari, 96x32,5 cm, Cleveland Museum of Art
Linsky Madonna, 94x42 cm, Metropolitan Museum, New York
St Dominic, 94x27 cm, Metropolitan Museum, New York
St George, 95x33 cm, Metropolitan Museum, New York
predella
St Peter, 29,3x21,5 cm, Yale University Art Gallery, New Haven
St Bartholomew, 28x15,5 cm, Pinacoteca del Castello Sforzesco, Milan
Christ Blessing, 28,8x26,2 cm, El Paso Museum of Art
St John the Evangelist, 28x15,5 cm, Pinacoteca del Castello Sforzesco, Milan
St Philip, 28x15,5 cm, E. Proehl collection, Amsterdam

Possible reconstruction

References

Paintings by Carlo Crivelli
1472 paintings
Paintings in the collection of the Metropolitan Museum of Art
Paintings of Saint George (martyr)
Paintings of Saint Dominic
Paintings depicting Saint Peter
Paintings of the Madonna and Child
Paintings depicting John the Apostle
Paintings of James the Great
Paintings of Saint Nicholas
Paintings of Bartholomew the Apostle
Paintings in the Yale University Art Gallery
Paintings in the collection of the Philadelphia Museum of Art
Paintings in the collection of the Cleveland Museum of Art
Paintings in the collection of the Brooklyn Museum
Paintings in the Sforza Castle
Paintings in Texas
Paintings in Amsterdam